BCPC may refer to:

 British Crop Production Council
 Provincial Court of British Columbia